Thomas "Tom" Michalski is an American information technology professional and Republican politician from Waukesha County, Wisconsin.  He is a member of the Wisconsin State Assembly, representing Wisconsin's 13th Assembly district since January 2023. He is also a member of the Waukesha County board of supervisors.

Biography
Tom Michalski was born and raised in Greenfield, Wisconsin.  He earned his bachelor's degree in business administration from the University of Wisconsin–Milwaukee.  He went to work providing information technology services to Marquette University in Milwaukee, and worked in that role for 30 years.

Political career

He moved to Elm Grove, Wisconsin, in Waukesha County, in the late 1990s, where he joined the volunteer fire department.  In 2011, he was elected to the board of trustees of Elm Grove, where he continues to serve to the present.  In 2016, he was also elected to the Waukesha County board of supervisors, and was re-elected in 2018, 2020, and 2022.  He was also appointed to the board of the Waukesha County Technical College.

In 2021, Wisconsin State Assembly incumbent Sara Rodriguez announced that she would run for Lieutenant Governor of Wisconsin rather than seeking another term in the Assembly.  Michalski announced his candidacy for the Republican nomination in the 13th Assembly district.  He narrowly prevailed over his primary opponent, Erik Ngutse, and went on to win the November general election with 56% of the vote.

Electoral history

Wisconsin Assembly (2022)

| colspan="6" style="text-align:center;background-color: #e9e9e9;"| Republican Primary, August 9, 2022

| colspan="6" style="text-align:center;background-color: #e9e9e9;"| General Election, November 8, 2022

References

External links
 Campaign website
 
 Tom Michalski at Wisconsin Vote

Year of birth unknown
Living people
University of Wisconsin–Milwaukee alumni
Republican Party members of the Wisconsin State Assembly
People from Elm Grove, Wisconsin
County supervisors in Wisconsin
American firefighters
21st-century American politicians
Year of birth missing (living people)